Patrik Rédeky (born 5 February 2002) is a Slovak footballer who plays for FC Petržalka as a defender.

Club career
Rédeky made his professional Fortuna Liga debut for FC Nitra against MFK Ružomberok on 28 November 2020.

References

External links
 
 Futbalnet profile 
 
 

2002 births
Living people
People from Bánovce nad Bebravou
Sportspeople from the Trenčín Region
Slovak footballers
Association football defenders
FC Nitra players
FC Petržalka players
Slovak Super Liga players
2. Liga (Slovakia) players